The 1917 Victorian state election was held on 15 November 1917.

Since the previous election, the Liberal Party had absorbed pro-conscription Labor defectors and become the Nationalist Party. However, the Nationalists contested this election as three competing factions: Ministerialists, the supporters of Alexander Peacock's government; the "Economy Party", supporters of John Bowser; and the National Labor Party, for those ex-Labor members now supporting the anti-Labor side of politics.

Retiring Members

Nationalist
Robert McCutcheon MLA (St Kilda)
James Membrey MLA (Jika Jika)

National Labor
John Chatham MLA (Grenville)

Legislative Assembly
Sitting members are shown in bold text. Successful candidates are highlighted in the relevant colour. Where there is possible confusion, an asterisk (*) is also used.

See also
1916 Victorian Legislative Council election

References

Psephos - Adam Carr's Election Archive

Victoria
Candidates for Victorian state elections